Josh Helps (born 22 December 1994) is a retired Welsh rugby union player. He played for the Scarlets as a second rower. 

Helps made his Quins debut as an 18-year-old against rivals Llanelli RFC. However, it was not until the 2015-16 season that he became a regular for the Quins, when he made 25 appearances - 23 of those were starts.

Helps is was part of the Scarlets squad. He made his debut in a friendly against the Bedford Blues.

During the 2022–2023 season, Helps retired from professional rugby to pursue a career in finance. He will however still play semi-professionally for Carmarthen Quins.

References

External links
 Carmarthen Quins profile

1994 births
Living people
Rugby union players from Narberth
Welsh rugby union players
Llanelli RFC players
Scarlets players
Rugby union locks